Natalie Dana Enright Jerger (née Enright) is an American computer scientist known for research in computer science including computer architecture and interconnection networks.

Education and career
Born in Plainfield, New Jersey, she attended Kent Place School and received a BS in computer engineering from Purdue University in 2002.

She joined the Edward S. Rogers Sr. Department of Electrical and Computer Engineering at the University of Toronto in 2009 as an Assistant Professor.  She was promoted to Associated Professor in 2014 and to Professor in 2017, becoming the Percy Edward Hart Professor of Electrical and Computer Engineering. Enright Jerger co-chairs the ACM Council on Diversity and Inclusion.

Recognition
2014: Young Engineer Medal from Professional Engineers Ontario.
2015: CRA-W Anita Borg Early Career Award (BECA). 2015 Alfred P. Sloan Research Fellowship.
2018: Named an ACM Distinguished Member. 
2019: Canada Research Chair in Computer Architecture.
2019: University of Toronto McLean Award.
2021: Elected as an IEEE Fellow "for contributions to networks-on-chip for many-core architectures".

Personal life
Enright Jerger is the grand-daughter of professional baseball player Tony Lupien, the great-granddaughter of Ulysses J. Lupien and cousin of professional wrestler and actor John Cena.

References

External links
 University of Toronto: Natalie Enright Jerger, Department of Electrical and Computer Engineering
 

American women computer scientists
American computer scientists
Living people
Kent Place School alumni
Purdue University College of Engineering alumni
Year of birth missing (living people)
People from Plainfield, New Jersey
University of Wisconsin–Madison College of Engineering alumni
Fellow Members of the IEEE
21st-century American women